HMS Lancaster was one of 10  armoured cruisers built for the Royal Navy in the first decade of the 20th century. Upon completion she was assigned to the 3rd Cruiser Squadron of the Mediterranean Fleet. She remained there until 1912 when she returned home to be placed in reserve. The ship was recommissioned in 1913 for service with the 4th Cruiser Squadron on the North America and West Indies Station. She remained there until she was assigned to the Grand Fleet in 1915. She was transferred to the Pacific in 1916 and she became flagship of the Eastern Squadron in 1918. The ship was sold for scrap in 1920.

Design and description
The ships were designed to displace . They were powered by two 4-cylinder triple-expansion steam engines, each driving one shaft using steam provided by 31 Belleville boilers. Lancaster, however, reached  during her sea trials.

The Monmouth-class ships' main armament consisted of fourteen breech-loading (BL)  Mk VII guns. Four of these guns were mounted in two twin-gun turrets, one each fore and aft of the superstructure, and the others were positioned in casemates amidships. Six of these were mounted on the main deck and were only usable in calm weather. Ten quick-firing (QF) 12-pounder 12-cwt guns were fitted for defence against torpedo boats. Lancaster also carried three 3-pounder  Hotchkiss guns and two submerged 18-inch (450 mm) torpedo tubes.

Beginning in 1915, the main deck six-inch guns of the Monmouth-class ships were moved to the upper deck and given gun shields. Their casemates were plated over to improve seakeeping. The twelve-pounder guns displaced by the transfer were repositioned elsewhere. At some point in the war, a pair of three-pounder anti-aircraft guns were installed on the upper deck. 
 
The armour of the gun turrets, their barbettes and the casemates was four inches thick.

Construction and service
Lancaster, named for the English county, was laid down by Armstrong Whitworth at their shipyard in Elswick on 4 March 1901 and launched on 22 March 1902, when she was christened by Mrs. Douglas, wife of Vice-Admiral A. L. Douglas, Second Naval Lord. She was completed on 5 April 1904 and was initially assigned to the 3rd Cruiser Squadron of the Mediterranean Fleet. She remained with the squadron after it was redesignated as the 6th Cruiser Squadron, not returning home until 1912 when she was assigned to the reserve 5th Cruiser Squadron. The following year Lancaster was recommissioned and assigned to the 4th Cruiser Squadron on the North America and West Indies Station.

After the beginning of World War I in August 1914, she searched for German commerce raiders and protected convoys until she returned home to join the 7th Cruiser Squadron of the Grand Fleet in 1915. She was transferred to the Pacific in April 1916 and became flagship of the Eastern Squadron in 1918. Lancaster was partially dismantled in Birkenhead before she was sold for scrap on 3 March 1920 and subsequently broken up in Blyth.

Notes

Footnotes

Bibliography 
 
 
 
 
 

 
 

Monmouth-class cruisers
Ships built by Armstrong Whitworth
Ships built on the River Tyne
1902 ships
World War I cruisers of the United Kingdom